Dugh-e Sar Bisheh (also Romanized as Dūgh-e Sar Bīsheh and Dūgh-e Sar-e Bīsheh; also known as Dūgh and Doogh) is a village in Momenabad Rural District, in the Central District of Sarbisheh County, South Khorasan Province, Iran. At the 2006 census, its population was 56, in 15 families.

References 

Populated places in Sarbisheh County